The 2020 Copa do Brasil final rounds were the final rounds (round of 16, quarter-finals, semi-finals and finals) of the 2020 Copa do Brasil football competition. They were played from 14 October 2020 to 7 March 2021. A total of 16 teams competed in the final rounds to decide the champions of the 2020 Copa do Brasil.

Format
In the final rounds, each tie was played on a home-and-away two-legged basis. If the aggregate score was level, the second-leg match would go straight to the penalty shoot-out to determine the winners.

Bracket

Round of 16

Draw
The draw for the round of 16 was held on 1 October 2020, 11:30 at CBF headquarters in Rio de Janeiro. The 16 qualified teams were drawn in a single group (CBF ranking shown in parentheses).

Matches

The first legs were played on 14 and 27–29 October and the second legs were played on 25 October and 3–5 November 2020.

|}
All times are Brasília time, BRT (UTC−3)

Match 76

Tied 5–5 on aggregate, São Paulo won on penalties and advanced to the quarter-finals.

Match 77

Ceará won 1–0 on aggregate and advanced to the quarter-finals.

Match 78

Grêmio won 2–0 on aggregate and advanced to the quarter-finals.

Match 79

Internacional won 4–2 on aggregate and advanced to the quarter-finals.

Match 80

Cuiabá won 1–0 on aggregate and advanced to the quarter-finals.

Match 81

Flamengo won 4–2 on aggregate and advanced to the quarter-finals.

Match 82

Palmeiras won 4–1 on aggregate and advanced to the quarter-finals.

Match 83

América Mineiro won 2–1 on aggregate and advanced to the quarter-finals.

Quarter-finals

Draw
The draw for the quarter-finals was held on 6 November 2020, 11:30 at CBF headquarters in Rio de Janeiro. All teams were placed into a single group (CBF ranking shown in parentheses).

Matches

The first legs were played on 11 November and the second legs were played on 18 November 2020.

|}
All times are Brasília time, BRT (UTC−3)

Match 84

São Paulo won 5–1 on aggregate and advanced to the semi-finals.

Match 85

Grêmio won 4–1 on aggregate and advanced to the semi-finals.

Match 86

Tied 1–1 on aggregate, América Mineiro won on penalties and advanced to the semi-finals.

Match 87

Palmeiras won 5–2 on aggregate and advanced to the semi-finals.

Semi-finals

Draw
The draw to determine the home-and-away teams for both legs were held on 24 November 2020, 15:00 at CBF headquarters in Rio de Janeiro.

Matches

The first legs were played on 23 December and the second legs were played on 30 December 2020.

|}
All times are Brasília time, BRT (UTC−3)

Match 88

Grêmio won 1–0 on aggregate and advanced to the finals.

Match 89

Palmeiras won 3–1 on aggregate and advanced to the finals.

Finals

Draw
The draw to determine the home-and-away teams for both legs was held on 14 January 2021, 11:30 at CBF headquarters in Rio de Janeiro.

Matches
The first leg was played on 28 February and the second leg was played on 7 March 2021.

|}
All times are Brasília time, BRT (UTC−3)

Match 90

References

2020 Copa do Brasil